Please find below supplementary chemical data about dichloromethane.

MSDS sheets
The handling of this chemical may incur notable safety precautions. It is highly recommend that you seek the Material Safety Datasheet (MSDS) for this chemical from a reliable source and follow its directions.
 Baker

Structure and properties

Thermodynamic properties

Vapor pressure of liquid

Table data obtained from CRC Handbook of Chemistry and Physics 47th ed.

Spectral data

Structure and properties data

References

 NIST website
 G. W. C. Kaye and T. H. Laby, Tables of Physical & Chemical Constants at National Physical Laboratory
 Heat capacity

Chemical data pages
Chemical data pages cleanup